Lucie Hradecká was the defending champion, but withdrew from the event.

Magdaléna Rybáriková won the tournament, defeating Petra Kvitová in the final, 6–3, 6–4.

Seeds

Draw

Finals

Top half

Bottom half

External links 
 Main draw

Sparta Prague Open - Singles
2011 Singles